WCVI-TV, virtual and UHF digital channel 23, is a dual CBS/ABC-affiliated television station serving the United States Virgin Islands that is licensed to Christiansted, Saint Croix. The station is owned by Lilly Broadcasting. WCVI-TV's transmitter is located on Estate Princess Hill.

History   
The station was founded as WATU on May 16, 1997, but then changed its call letters to the current WCVI-TV that same year on June 30, as an affiliate of the United Paramount Network (UPN). The WATU calls were previously used by the now-defunct NBC affiliate in Augusta, Georgia from the station's sign on from 1968 to 1981. Before then, UPN programming was seen via satellite from New York City's WWOR-TV. At one point, the station also carried Urban America Television as a secondary affiliation; this arrangement was discontinued when that network ceased operations on May 1, 2006. That September, WCVI joined The CW following the shutdown of both UPN and The WB.

On April 17, 2014, Virgin Blue reached a deal to sell WCVI-TV to LeSEA Broadcasting Corporation (now Family Broadcasting Corporation); the sale was completed on July 27, 2014, with LeSEA assuming ownership on July 28, 2014. Upon acquisition, WCVI dropped its CW programming in exchange for programs from LeSEA and World Harvest. It was unknown where CW network programming will be carried in the U.S. Virgin Islands at the time of the transaction becoming final, but CW programming is seen on cable channel 13 via WSEE-DT2 in Erie, Pennsylvania.

WCVI-DT2 serves as the ABC affiliate for the Virgin Islands since the network ended its affiliation with WSVI-TV at the end of 2015. At the time, ABC announced that WCVI would become its new affiliate for the territory, although station management denied any knowledge of such an arrangement. ABC programming duly began in 2016, however, as WCVI-DT2 began relaying a feed of WENY-TV in Elmira, New York provided to the area by Lilly Broadcasting; non-network timeslots are filled by paid programming and Lilly's One Caribbean Television.

On September 10, 2019, WCVI was sold to Lilly Broadcasting for $85,000, pending approval of the Federal Communications Commission (FCC). The sale allows Lilly to invoke must-carry rules on local cable and satellite providers, avoiding a potential repeat of notorious carriage disputes with Dish Network and DirecTV in 2017. The sale was completed on November 5, 2019. Lilly also announced that its CBS feed for the market, previously only available on cable via a separate feed of Erie, Pennsylvania affiliate WSEE-TV, would move to WCVI-DT1 on November 20. It was the first time in three years that the U.S. Virgin Islands had one of the "Big Four" networks carried on their primary channels on a full-power TV station since WSVI-TV switched from ABC to Ion Television on December 31, 2015.

Subchannels
The station's digital signal is multiplexed:

Logos

References

External links 
Official website

CBS network affiliates
ABC network affiliates
Television channels and stations established in 1997
CVI-TV
1997 establishments in the United States Virgin Islands